Wietse Bosmans (born 30 December 1991 in Brasschaat) is a Belgian cyclist, who currently rides for Belgian team Creafin–TÜV SÜD.

Major results

Cyclo-cross

2008–2009 
1st  Junior National Championships
1st Superprestige juniors, Hoogstraten
4th Junior World Championships
2009–2010
3rd Under-23 National Championships
2010-2011
GvA Trophy Under-23
1st Azencross
1st Grand Prix Sven Nys
2nd Under-23 National Championships
3rd Overall Under-23 World Cup
1st Heusden-Zolder
6th Under-23 World Championships
2011–2012
1st  Under-23 National Championships
Superprestige Under-23
1st Ruddervoorde
1st Zonhoven
GvA Trophy Under-23
1st Azencross
1st Krawatencross
1st Sluitingsprijs Oostmalle
1st Side Event Under-23, Heusden-Zolder
2nd Under-23 World Championships
8th Overall Under-23 World Cup
2012–2013
1st Overall Under-23 World Cup
1st Plzeň
1st Koksijde
1st Heusden-Zolder
1st Hoogerheide
 Superprestige Under-23
1st Hoogstraten
1st Overall bpost bank trophy Under-23
1st Grand Prix van Hasselt
1st Grand Prix Sven Nys
2nd Under-23 World Championships
2015–2016
 QianSen Trophy Cyclocross
1st Yanqing Station, Beijing
1st Qiongzhong Station, Hainan
1st Nittany Lion Cross #1
1st Nittany Lion Cross #2
2016–2017
1st GGEW Grand Prix, Bensheim
1st Grand Prix Möbel Alvisse
1st Kasteelcross Zonnebeke

Road
2017
7th Heistse Pijl

References

External links

1991 births
Living people
Belgian male cyclists
Cyclo-cross cyclists
People from Brasschaat
Cyclists from Antwerp Province
21st-century Belgian people